Kamatanda Airport  is an abandoned airport near the town of Likasi in Democratic Republic of the Congo.
It used to serve the Kamatanda mining area.

See also

 Transport in the Democratic Republic of the Congo
 List of airports in the Democratic Republic of the Congo

References

Defunct airports
Airports in Haut-Katanga Province
Likasi